Cliniodes superbalis is a moth in the family Crambidae. It was described by Paul Dognin in 1911. It is found in the eastern Andes, from Bolivia to Colombia. It is possibly also present in Venezuela.

The length of the forewings is 13–19 mm for males and 15–19 mm for females. The forewing costa is dark red and the basal area is grey with ruby scales. The medial area is also grey and the postmedial area is ruddy brown near the postmedial line, but mostly consist of an orange patch. The hindwings are translucent white with a black marginal band. Adults have been recorded on wing year round.

References

Moths described in 1911
Eurrhypini